Hagues Peak is the highest summit of the Mummy Range in the Rocky Mountains of North America. Hagues Peak is the highest point in Larimer County, Colorado.

Mountain
Hagues Peak is named after geologists James and Arnold Hague, who surveyed the area in the late 1800s.

See also

List of mountain peaks of North America
List of mountain peaks of the United States
List of mountain peaks of Colorado
List of Colorado county high points

References

External links

Mountains of Colorado